Soweto Panthers is a South African basketball club based in Soweto in Johannesburg. The team plays in the Basketball National League (BNL) and WBNL. The team was founded in 1986,  the Men's won the BNL championship in 2018. The Women's team was formed in 2020 leading to the launch of the WBNL in 2021

The Soweto Panthers Men joined the BNL in 2011, the Ladies joined in 2020.

Honors 
In October 2018, the Panthers beat Egoli Magic 84–58 to captured the championship.

The Panthers were led by

Head coach: Steven Butler

General manager: Elvis Ukpong

Fitness and Conditioning Coach: Gcina Panyana

League Achievements 
Champions - 2018

Finalist - 2019

Semifinals - 2013, 2014, 2016, 2017, 2021

Regular Season Champion - 2016, 2019

Club Members

Coaches 
Nosipho Njokweni - women

Taurai Takarupiwe - men

Players 2021

Notable players

- Set a club record or won an individual award as a professional player.
- Played at least one official international match for his senior national team at any time.

 Thabo Letsebe
 Neo Mothiba
 Lehlogonolo Tholo
 Tatenda Maturure
 Lebohang Mofokeng

References

Basketball teams established in 1986
Basketball teams in South Africa
1986 establishments in South Africa